Louise Mary Minchin (born September 1968) is a British television presenter, journalist and former news presenter who currently works freelance within the BBC.

Beginning in 2012, Minchin was a regular anchor on the BBC One programme Breakfast, co-hosting the show three days a week with Dan Walker. On 8 June 2021, Minchin announced live on air that she would be leaving BBC Breakfast "after the summer", after presenting the show for 20 years (at first as a stand-in host). Her final appearance on the show was on 15 September 2021.

From 2009 until 2012, Minchin co-hosted Real Rescues alongside Nick Knowles and Chris Hollins. She has guest-hosted The One Show a number of times since 2010.

Early life

Minchin spent her early life in British Hong Kong, where her father was a Major in the Irish Guards of the British Army. She was educated at St Mary's School, Ascot, and has a degree in Spanish from the University of St Andrews. She subsequently studied journalism at the London College of Communication.

Career

Minchin started her career in the Latin American section of the BBC World Service during a year in Argentina, the Today programme, Five and various local radio stations. In 2006, she toured the country in a converted bus meeting England fans as part of the World Cup coverage for BBC News.

She started work for Radio 5 Live in 1998, and married David Minchin the same year. She presented many of the station's main programmes, including Drive and Breakfast. Between September 2003 and April 2012, she was a regular BBC News Channel presenter, initially working alongside Jon Sopel from 7 pm to 10 pm. Minchin then presented the 2 pm to 5 pm slot, also with Sopel, sharing this shift with Emily Maitlis. She was also one of the main relief presenters for BBC News at One until April 2012.

In 2006 and 2007, Minchin was a relief presenter on BBC Breakfast while Kate Silverton covered for main anchor Sian Williams. After Williams returned, she continued to co-host the programme, and from May 2009 until April 2012 was the regular weekend presenter of the show. In December 2011, the BBC announced that Minchin would replace Williams as a main presenter of BBC Breakfast along with Bill Turnbull and Charlie Stayt when the programme moved to Salfordthe first edition was presented on Tuesday 10 April 2012. On Tuesday 8 June 2021, she announced live on BBC Breakfast that she would be stepping down from the role later that year to concentrate on other interests. Her final appearance on the show was on 15 September 2021.

From 21 April 2008, Minchin presented a weekday programme called Missing Live along with Rav Wilding. The programme was shown at 9:15 am after BBC Breakfast on BBC One and ran for four weeks. The show returned for a second four-week run from 16 March 2009, and again in March 2010, highlighting both new cases and those previously featured with updates.

Minchin and Colin Jackson presented the Sunday morning show Sunday Life on BBC One in 2008.

From 2 November 2009, Minchin presented four weeks of live broadcasts of Real Rescues along with Nick Knowles.

Minchin also presented In the Know, a BBC sports magazine programme on Saturday mornings on BBC One during the 2004 Athens Olympics alongside co-presenter John Inverdale.

In April 2010, Minchin co-presented The One Show for a week alongside Chris Hollins while regular hosts Adrian Chiles and Christine Bleakley were unavailable. She covered again when the show returned in July 2010 for two weeks alongside Matt Baker and one episode with Matt Allwright.

Minchin and Gethin Jones presented the documentary series Crime and Punishment, which began on BBC One on 12 March 2012.

For a time from November 2012, Minchin was a co-presenter of Radio 5 Live's Drive programme with Peter Allen. She has worked as an occasional presenter of BBC Radio 4's daily consumer programme You and Yours.

Minchin has played herself reading the news in three BBC series: spy drama Spooks, crime drama Silent Witness and the Torchwood mini-series Children of Earth.

In 2016, Minchin competed in Celebrity MasterChef on BBC One, finishing second.

In June 2021, BBC announced that Minchin was to leave BBC Breakfast after almost 20 years of working on the show.

In November 2021, Minchin was announced as a contestant on the twenty-first series of I'm a Celebrity...Get Me Out of Here! and finished in seventh.

Awards

In March 2014, she was awarded an Honorary Doctor of Letters degree by the University of Chester.

Personal life

Louise married David Minchin in 1998. The couple have two daughters and live in Chester, Cheshire.

She is an amateur triathlete, and qualified as a member of the 2015 Great Britain Age-Group Triathlon Team (45–49 age group). She competed in the standard distance event (1500 m swim, a 40 km bike ride and a 10 km run) at the World Triathlon Championships in Chicago on 19 September 2015. She qualified for the team at the Dambuster Triathlon at Rutland Water on 15 June 2015. She went on to finish 71st out of 78 finishers at the ITU World Triathlon Championships.

In 2019, Minchin talked about the menopause, describing her experience of suffering hot flushes on the BBC Breakfast set that led to them lowering the temperature. A man who stalked both Minchin and one of her daughters pleaded guilty in October 2021 to sending intimidating messages via Instagram. The crimes occurred in July 2020 during the term of a suspended sentence for stalking Girls Aloud singer Nicola Roberts.

Charity

Minchin is a supporter of SOS Children's Villages, an international orphan charity providing homes and mothers for orphaned and abandoned children.

She has also taken part in "Around the World in 80 days" for Children in Need.

She is a supporter of the charity Missing People, which provides support for missing children, vulnerable adults and families left in limbo.

See also
 List of I'm a Celebrity...Get Me Out of Here! (British TV series) contestants

References

External links
Official website@ 
BBC Breakfast Profile

Living people
Alumni of the University of St Andrews
BBC newsreaders and journalists
BBC World Service people
British reporters and correspondents
British broadcast news analysts
I'm a Celebrity...Get Me Out of Here! (British TV series) participants
People from British Hong Kong
1968 births